"Unaccommodating" is a song by American rapper Eminem, released from his eleventh studio album, Music to Be Murdered By, in 2020. It is the second track on the album, and features American rapper Young M.A performing the first verse. Recording sessions took place at Effigy Studios in Detroit with Mike Strange. Production was handled by Tim Suby with additional production by Eminem.

Despite never being released as a single, the song has managed to chart worldwide.

Controversy
The lyrics of "Unaccommodating", in which Eminem referenced the 2017 Manchester Arena bombing, drew significant criticism, with many critics finding the lyrics objectionable. The mayor of Manchester Andy Burnham denounced the song's lyrics, describing them as "unnecessarily hurtful and deeply disrespectful". The lyrics also drew widespread criticism from victims' relatives and others involved in the attack.

Roisin O'Connor of The Independent criticized Eminem and said that he "belittles the trauma of a then 26-year-old Ariana Grande for kicks on 'Unaccommodating' by comparing himself to the Manchester Arena bomber."

Personnel
Marshall Mathers – main artist, vocals, songwriter, additional producer
Katorah Marrero – featured artist, vocals, songwriter
Timothy Suby – songwriter, producer
Luis Resto – songwriter, additional keyboards
Mike Strange – recording, mixing
Joe Strange – additional engineering
Tony Campana – additional engineering

Charts

References

2020 songs
Eminem songs
Songs written by Eminem
Song recordings produced by Eminem